Legacy World (Japanese レガシーワールド, 23 April 1989 - 18 August 2021) was a Japanese Thoroughbred racehorse best known for winning the 1993 Japan Cup. He failed to win in five starts as a juvenile and was gelded before the start of his second season. In 1992 he won six races including the Grade II St Lite Kinen, finished fourth in the Japan Cup and ran second in the Arima Kinen. In the following year he was lightly raced and made only two appearances before defeating a top-class international field in the Japan Cup at Tokyo Racecourse. His later career was blighted by injury and he failed to win in fourteen subsequent races before being retired in 1996.

Background
Legacy World was a bay gelding with no white markings bred in Japan by the Heihata Farm. His sire Mogami raced in France where he won the valuable Prix des Foals at Deauville Racecourse in 1978 before retiring to become a breeding stallion in Japan. He sired several major winners including Sirius Symboli (Tokyo Yushun), Mejiro Ramona (Yushun Himba) and Buzen Candle (Shuka Sho). Legacy World was one of several winners produced by the Japanese mare Donna Lydia, an unraced daughter of the American stallion Jim French. She was descended from Propontis, a British broodmare who was imported to Japan in the first decade of the 20th century.

During his track career, Legacy World raced in the colours of Horse Tajima Co Ltd and was initially trained by Toyama Tameo.

Racing career

1991: two-year-old season
Legacy World failed to win in five races as a two-year-old in 1991. Competing exclusively in maiden races he finished fourth over 1200 metres at Hakodate Racecourse on his debut on 18 August and then ran second over the same course and distance six days later. The best of his three subsequent efforts came when he finished third to Dyna Splendor over 1600 metres at Kyoto Racecourse in October. At the end of his first season, Legacy World's lack of success and difficult temperament led to the decision to have the colt gelded.

1992: three-year-old season
On his debut as a three-year-old, Legacy World recorded his first win when he defeated fifteen opponents in a maiden over 1800 metres at Fukushima Racecourse on 11 July. He finished third at Niigata Racecourse two weeks later and then won twice at Hakodate in August, taking the Okushiri Tokubetsu over 2000 metres and the Matsumae Tokubetsu over 2500 metres. On September 13 the gelding finished second to the four-year-old filly Janis at Hakodate and was then moved up in class for the Grade II St Lite Kinen over 2200 metres at Nakayama Racecourse two weeks later. He recorded his first major victory as he defeated the Tokyo Yushun runner-up Rice Shower, with Super Sovereign in third, but, as a gelding, he was ineligible to run in the Kikuka Sho which was won by Rice Shower. In October, Legacy World won the Tokyo Sports Hai over 2400 metres at Tokyo Racecourse and on 8 November he recorded his sixth victory of the year when he took the Doncaster Stakes over the same distance at Kyoto.

On 29 November at Tokyo, Legacy World was moved up to the highest level and started a 16.9/1 outsider for the twelfth running of the Japan Cup over 2400 metres. Ridden by Hiroshi Kawachi he finished fourth of the fourteen runners behind Tokai Teio, Naturalism and the Arlington Million winner Dear Doctor. The unplaced horses included User Friendly, Let's Elope, Dr Devious and Quest for Fame. On his final appearance of the year, Legacy World was invited to compete in the Arima Kinen over 2500 metres at Nakayama on 27 December and finished second of the sixteen runners behind the five-year-old Mejiro Palmer with Nice Nature in third.

1993: four-year-old season

Legacy World returned in January 1993 at Nakayama and finished second to the six-year-old White Stone in the Grade II American Jockey Club Cup over 2200 metres. After Toyama's death in May 1993, the gelding entered the stable of the first-season trainer Hideyuki Mori.

After an absence of more than eight months, Legacy World returned in the Grade II Kyoto Daishoten over 2400 metres on 10 October and finished second of the ten runners to Mejiro McQueen. On 28 November, in front of a record crowd of 175,000, the gelding made his second attempt to win the Japan Cup, a race which pitted seven Japanese horses against nine overseas challengers, and started at odds of 11.5/1. The other Japanese runners were Winning Ticket (Tokyo Yushun), Rice Shower, Mejiro Palmer, Matikanetannhauser (third in the Kikuka Sho), Nice Nature and the dirt racer Hashiru Shogun (Teio Sho). The North American contingent comprised Kotashaan (the 4.2/1 favourite), Star of Cozzene and Luazar (Del Mar Handicap) whilst Europe was represented by White Muzzle (Derby Italiano) from Britain, Urban Sea from France, Misil (Premio Roma) from Italy and Platini (Gran Premio di Milano) from Germany. The other two runners were Naturalism from Australia and The Phantom Chance from New Zealand. Kawachi tracked the leaders and reached the final turn in second place behind Mejiro Palmer before taking the lead in the straight. He stayed on strongly in the closing stages to win by one and a quarter lengths with Kotashaan taking second in a three-way photo finish from Winning Ticket and Platini. Kent Desormeaux, the rider of the runner-up, was fined by the racecourse stewards after he mistook the finish line and stopped riding 100 metres from the end of the race. After the gelding's victory, Hideyuki Mori said "The horse was very lightly raced. Legacy World was therefore a fresh horse, specially prepared for the Japan Cup. This was his target". Kawachi, who was winning the race at the fifth attempt commented "I was secretly confident the big chance was today".

On his last run of the year, Legacy World was again invited to run in the Arima Kinen, but finished fifth of fourteen behind Tokai Teio on 26 December.

1995 & 1996: later career

Legacy World missed the whole of 1994 after sustaining a serious tendon injury, and although he returned for two more seasons in 1995 and 1996 he never recovered his best form. As a six-year-old he finished no better than ninth in six races. In his final season he ran seven times, finishing fourth in a minor race at Hanshin and ending his career by finishing eighth to Mayano Top Gun in Takarazuka Kinen on 7 July 1996.

At the end of his racing career, Legacy World was retired to a retirement facility in Hokkaido, where he died on August 18, 2021 due to infirmities of old age.

Pedigree

References 

1989 racehorse births
2021 racehorse deaths
Racehorses bred in Japan
Racehorses trained in Japan
Thoroughbred family 4-d
Japan Cup winners